Reid Hunt (1870–1948), was an American pharmacologist, known for his work on adrenal glands; where he postulated that extracts from which cause rise in blood pressure due to its content of adrenaline. When he removed the adrenaline from the extract and he found that it causes fall in blood pressure, which he concluded was due to a derivative of choline, later on known as acetylcholine.

Research

Methyl alcohol toxicity

Activity of acetylcholine

Thyroid gland
During the study of thyroid gland iodine content and its physiological activity he demonstrated the presence of thyroid hormone in the human blood. Studies involving acetonitrile showed that the poisoning is mainly due to the hydrocyanic acid liberated in the organism and its ability to neutralise various sulphur compounds.

Positions held
 Tutor in physiology (1896–1898), Columbia university medical school.
 Chief of pharmacological division (1904–1913), Hygienic laboratory,U.S. public health service.
 Chair of pharmacology, Harvard medical school.
 Chairman of council on pharmacy and chemistry of the American medical association.
 President of pharmacopeial convention.
 Chairman of northeastern section of American chemical society.
 Secretary and president of American society for pharmacology and experimental therapeutics.
 Chairman of the section of on pharmacology and therapeutics of American medical association.
 Consultant for chemical warfare service, U.S. army
 Consultant, Massachusetts state board of health
 Consultant, Hygienic laboratory.
 Member, Drug standardisation committee of league of nations.

References 

1870 births
1948 deaths
American pharmacologists
People from Clinton County, Ohio